Noble Justice: The Lost Songs is a digital album by rapper Young Noble released on March 23, 2010. The project consists of lost songs as well as past released songs by Young Noble.

Track listing

References

External links 
 OutlawzMedia.net Official Website

2010 albums
Young Noble albums
Outlawz albums
Albums produced by E.D.I.